is a Japanese anime television series created by Hiroyuki Imaishi and produced by Studio Trigger. It aired from April to June 2016 as part of the Ultra Super Anime Time programming block.

Plot
Luluco is a normal girl living in the solar system frontier space colonization zone Ogikubo. Her father works for the zone's Space Patrol division. Despite being a part of this wondrous district full of alien immigrants, Luluco often lives an ordinary life as a student. When her father is accidentally frozen by alien contraband, Luluco is forced to request help from her father's Space Patrol division. She is appointed a member of the Space Patrol by the division chief, named Over Justice, in order to pay the fees required to revive her father. From then on, Luluco's previously normal life faces drastic changes as she is sent on daily missions to protect Ogikubo from space criminals. On these missions she bands together with her assigned partner and alien exchange student ΑΩ (pronounced "Alpha Omega") Nova, as well as their fairly normal mutual classmate Midori.

Characters

A thirteen-year-old student living with her father in Ogikubo. Her one true wish is to lead a normal life despite her odd living place. When her father accidentally freezes himself and falls into pieces, she brings him to his workplace where she is assigned the role of a space officer against her will.

A Space Patrol officer and partner of Luluco. He is a recent transfer student at Luluco's school and her classmate.

A fellow student at Luluco's school and classmate. After being caught as the publisher and distributor of a quasi-legal Blackhole App, she volunteers to join the Space Patrol in order to get out of any punishments for her crime, as well as to spend more time at the side of ΑΩ Nova.

The head of the Space Patrol Ogikubo Branch and Luluco's boss.

A temporary staff worker at the Space Patrol. She serves as Over Justice's personal secretary.

A Space Patrol officer and Luluco's father who becomes frozen after eating a strange pellet.

Luluco's mother and a space pirate. She seeks to take over Ogikubo. Just like the members of the Space Patrol, she has a gun morphing ability, called "God Pirate's Gun Morphing".

Media

Anime
The series is written and directed by Hiroyuki Imaishi with character design by Mago and Yusuke Yoshigaki. Bonjour Suzuki. The series features cameo appearances from other Trigger animations, including Kill la Kill, Little Witch Academia, Inferno Cop,  Kiznaiver, and Sex and Violence with Machspeed. Crunchyroll has licensed the series in North America and simulcasted the show in Japanese with english subtitles, while Funimation would later produce a dub on October 10, 2017. However, due to the split between both Crunchyroll and Funimation, the english dub was removed and put on Crunchyroll, as well as being taken off of digital purchasing sites. The average run time is 8 minutes for all episodes.

Manga
A manga adaptation illustrated by Nanboku began serialization in Shueisha's Ultra Jump magazine in April and June 2016 and was released in English by Crunchyroll.

Notes

References

External links
 

Action anime and manga
Anime series
Anime with original screenplays
AT-X (TV network) original programming
Comedy anime and manga
Crossover anime and manga
Crossover television
Funimation
Parody anime and manga
Science fiction anime and manga
Seinen manga
Shueisha manga
Surreal comedy anime and manga
Studio Trigger
2016 anime television series debuts
Extraterrestrials in anime and manga